UB40 Live is a 1983 album (cat no. LPDEP 4) of live concert recordings of UB40 performing songs from their first three studio albums.

Track listing
"Food for Thought"
"Sardonicus"
"Don't Slow Down"
"Folitician"
"Tyler"
"Present Arms"
"The Piper Calls the Tune"
"Love Is All Is Alright"
"Burden of Shame"
"One in Ten"

Certifications

References

UB40 albums
1983 live albums